The Charles C. Leary is the first studio album by Devendra Banhart. It was released on August 8, 2002, through the label Hinah.

Track listing

Personnel
Devendra Banhart
Colter Jacobson – guitar on "I Played Organ While Colter Played Guitar"
Sarah Cain – vocals on track "Joe Cain"

References

External links
 Official Devendra Banhart site
 hinah listing

2002 debut albums
Devendra Banhart albums